Bronz are  an English hard rock band, formed in Bath in the mid-1970s. The band played mainly around the UK and at the 'free festivals' of the time.  These included performances at Stonehenge and Glastonbury in 1978.

Career
After an early tie up with Dave Panton as their part-time manager in 1980, the band played many support slots at The Marquee and Music Machine with Angel Witch, More, Diamond Head, and Anvil. The band reappeared in 1983, with Chris Goulstone on guitar and keyboards, Shaun Kirkpatrick on guitar and backing vocals, Clive Deamer on drums, plus Paul Webb on bass guitar and vocals. They were signed to an independent record label, Bronze Records. The band recorded Taken by Storm with Ritchie Cordell and Glen Kolotkin, later helped by Gerry Bron and Mark Dearnley on production.

They were launched onto the American market via a tie-in between Bronze Records and Island. The line-up, then based in London, consisted of ex-Nightwing vocalist Max Bacon, Goulstone, Kirkpatrick, Webb and new drummer Carl Matthews. In 1998, an album of unreleased tracks from that time, entitled Unfinished Business was released. 

Following the demise of Bronze Records and the original line-up in 1984, after a major US tour supporting Ratt, Kirkpatrick assembled a completely new line-up called 'Blue Print'.  With producer Max Norman they created a new album, Carried by the Storm, which was recorded in London's Roundhouse and Power Plant recording studios.  The band then comprised Kirkpatrick (guitars / Roland guitar synthesizer), Ian Baker (lead vocals), Mickey O'Donoghue (guitar), Clive Edwards (drums), and Lee Reddings (bass).  Guest musicians included Phil Lanzon, Chris Thompson, Stevie Lange, Gary Barnacle and Charlie McCracken. During the final recording and completion of the album, the record label went into receivership, and until 2010 Carried by the Storm remained unreleased.

Bronz re-formed briefly in 2000, with the 1984 line-up including Paul Webb resuming lead vocal duties; plus Jake Kirkpatrick on bass guitar. The band played a number of shows together, and a deal was tied up with Sanctuary Records in 2003, with the release of live tracks from their 1984 US tour and some new material. This was released as Bronz Live – Getting Higher. 

In 2005, Bronz with Goulstone, Thomas, and Scottish drummer Windsor McGilvray, appeared at the 25th anniversary of the beginning of the new wave of British heavy metal, at the Astoria in London, along with Diamond Head and Jaguar.
 
In 2010 and 2011, the line-up that recorded the second album managed an independent release of Carried by the Storm. The band led by Kirkpatrick appeared at the Hard Rock Hell Festival in December 2011, with Max Bacon the band's original singer from the first album returning, and Paul Webb back on bass.

In July 2013, guitarist Shaun Kirkpatrick died. At the time, Shaun was working on new material.

Albums
Taken by Storm (1984) (featuring the single "Send Down an Angel" b/w "Tiger")
Unfinished Business (1998)
Bronz Live – Getting Higher (2003)
Carried by the Storm (2010)

See also
List of new wave of British heavy metal bands
GTR

References

External links
 Chrisgoulstone.co.uk

English hard rock musical groups
English heavy metal musical groups
Musical groups from Somerset
New Wave of British Heavy Metal musical groups
Bronze Records artists
Sanctuary Records artists